The Detroit Steam Motors Corporation of Detroit, Michigan, U.S., is a defunct American steam car motor car manufacturer.

The Detroit Steam Motors Corporation introduced its first steam cars, called Trask-Detroits, in 1922. The Trask-Detroit was an assembled, or built-up car, with its boiler, engine and related parts manufactured by Schlieder Manufacturing Co., a Detroit valve manufacturer. It was intended as a popular-priced steam car, something that had never been done (steam cars' high quality engineering conspiring with low production runs to cause high selling prices). The basic model was to be a touring car with a selling price of $1,000.

For some time the company planned to have Trask-Detroits built in Canada by Windsor Steam Motors in Windsor, Ontario just across the river from Detroit. This would have allowed the cars to be sold in Canada with a minimum of tariffs, and allow favourable import treatment to other parts of the British Empire.

A larger model car was announced in late 1923, with a sedan priced at $1,900. A contemporary report in The Wall Street Journal stated that the car bodies "...will be made by the Packard Motor Car Co..". However, Packard quickly issued a denial and the Trask-Detroit soon vanished, reappearing in the form of the Brooks steam car in Canada.

See also

 Brooks Steam Motors
 Steam engine
 Timeline of steam power

External links
 The Steam Car Club of Great Britain.net: "Brooks Steam Motors" article

Steam cars
Defunct motor vehicle manufacturers of the United States
Motor vehicle manufacturers based in Michigan
Vehicle manufacturing companies established in 1922
1922 establishments in Michigan
Defunct manufacturing companies based in Detroit